Eccellenza Liguria is the regional Eccellenza football division for clubs in the northern Italian region of Liguria. It consists of 16 teams competing in one group. The winning team is promoted to Serie D, the top level of Italian amateur football. The club that finishes second may also gain promotion by taking part in a two-round national play-off.

Champions 
The past champions of Eccellenza Liguria were:

1991–92 Sanremese
1992–93 Migliarinese
1993–94 Sestrese
1994–95 Pontedecimo
1995–96 Sanremese
1996–97 Entella Chiavari
1997–98 Sestrese
1998–99 Entella Chiavari
1999–00 Savona
2000–01 Vado
2001–02 Lavagnese				
2002–03 Fo.Ce. Vara 
2003–04 Loanesi S.Francesco
2004–05 Sestri Levante
2005–06 Imperia
2006–07 Sestrese
2007–08 Virtus Entella
2008–09 Borgorosso Arenzano
2009–10 Sanremese
2010–11 Bogliasco
2011–12 Sestri Levante
2012–13 Vado
2013–14 Argentina
2014–15 Ligorna
2015–16 FBC Finale
2016–17 Albissola
2017–18 Fezzanese
2018–19 Vado
2019–20 Imperia
2020–21 Ligorna
2021–22 Fezzanese

References 

Sport in Liguria
Lig
Sports leagues established in 1991
1991 establishments in Italy
Football clubs in Italy
Association football clubs established in 1991